Joseph Nasco (born June 18, 1984) is an American professional soccer player.

Career
After spending time in Andrew College and Birmingham–Southern College, Nasco made eight appearances for Panama City Pirates in the USL Premier Development League. However, he left the game shortly after battling injury and took a job as a police officer for the Gordon County Sheriff's Department in Calhoun, Georgia.

In 2012, Nasco caught an eye of the Atlanta Silverbacks coaching staff at the team's first open combine and on March 21, Nasco signed a professional contract with the Silverbacks. On May 16, Nasco made his professional debut in a 3–0 loss to the Puerto Rico Islanders.

On February 12, 2014, Nasco signed with Major League Soccer club Colorado Rapids. On September 5, against the Los Angeles Galaxy, he set the MLS record for the fastest red card in a game with a foul against Alan Gordon a mere 34 seconds into the match.

References

External links
 Atlanta Silverbacks bio

1984 births
Living people
American soccer players
Panama City Beach Pirates players
Atlanta Silverbacks players
Colorado Rapids players
Fort Lauderdale Strikers players
Birmingham Legion FC players
Association football goalkeepers
Soccer players from Florida
USL League Two players
North American Soccer League players
Major League Soccer players
Andrew College alumni
People from Kissimmee, Florida
Birmingham–Southern Panthers men's soccer players
Association football goalkeeping coaches
Birmingham–Southern Panthers coaches